Inquisitor japonicus is a species of sea snail, a marine gastropod mollusk in the family Pseudomelatomidae, the turrids and allies.

Distribution
This marine species occurs off Japan and in the Yellow Sea.

References

 Kuroda T, Habe T, Oyama K, 1971. The sea shells of Sagami Bay. Tokyo: Maruzen Co., Ltd.xix+ 714 pp., 121 pls.
 Liu J.Y. [Ruiyu] (ed.). (2008). Checklist of marine biota of China seas. China Science Press. 1267 pp

External links
 H. Pilsbry (1895), Catalogue of the marine mollusks of Japan
 
  Baoquan Li 李宝泉 & R.N. Kilburn, Report on Crassispirinae Morrison, 1966 (Mollusca: Neogastropoda: Turridae) from the China Seas; Journal of Natural History 44(11):699-740 · March 2010; DOI: 10.1080/00222930903470086

japonicus
Gastropods described in 1869